Maximilian Pommer (born 18 August 1997) is a German footballer who plays as a midfielder for Bonner SC.

References

1997 births
People from Neuhaus am Rennweg
Footballers from Thuringia
Living people
German footballers
Association football midfielders
FC Rot-Weiß Erfurt players
1. FC Lokomotive Leipzig players
FC Rot-Weiß Koblenz players
Bonner SC players
3. Liga players
Regionalliga players
Oberliga (football) players